The Jensen-Healey is a British two-seater convertible sports car, produced by Jensen Motors Ltd. in West Bromwich, England from 1972 until 1976. 

Launched in 1972 as a luxurious and convertible sports car, it was positioned in the market between the Triumph TR6 and the Jaguar E-Type. A related fastback, the Jensen GT, was introduced in 1975.

Design
When production of the Austin-Healey 3000 ended, Donald Healey opened discussions with Jensen Motors, who had built the bodies for Healey's Austin-Healey cars. The largest Austin-Healey dealer in the U.S., San Francisco-based Kjell Qvale, was also keen to find a replacement to the Austin-Healey 3000; Qvale would become a major shareholder of Jensen, making Donald Healey the chairman. The Jensen-Healey was developed in a joint venture by Donald Healey, his son Geoffrey, and Jensen Motors. Hugo Poole did the styling of the body, the front, and back of which were later modified by William Towns to take advantage of the low profile engine and to allow cars for the U.S. market to be fitted with bumpers to meet increasingly strict U.S. safety regulations. The unitary body understructure was designed by Barry Bilbie, who had been responsible for the Austin-Healey 100, 100-6 and 3000 as well as the Sprite.  It was designed to be easy to repair, with bolt-on panels, to keep insurance premiums down.

Early cars (1973-1974.5) were fitted with two-piece steel and chrome bumpers originally designed for the Jensen-Healey.  Later cars used redesigned black rubber bumpers to comply with US government regulations and meet the new 5-mph crash standard.

Engines and transmissions

Various engines were tried out in the prototype stage including Vauxhall, Ford and BMW units. A German Ford V6 was considered but industrial action crippled supply. BMW could not supply an engine in the volumes needed. Colin Chapman of Lotus offered, and Jensen accepted, his company's new 1973 cc Lotus 907 dual overhead cam, 16-valve all-alloy engine. This multi-valve engine was the first modern dual overhead cam 4 valve per cylinder engine to be mass-produced on an assembly line. This setup put out approximately 144 bhp (107 kW), topping out at 119 mph (192 km/h) and accelerating from zero to 60 mph in 7.8 seconds (8.1 seconds for the emission controlled U.S. version).

International variation
Vehicles for European distribution and sale contained dual side-draught twin-throat Dell'Orto DHLA carburettors (similar to Weber DCOE carburettors but with improved progression circuits); those exported to the United States had dual side-draught single-throat CD175 Zenith Strombergs in order to meet emissions requirements. The oil cooler was absent in the earliest models.

The initial transmission was a four-speed Chrysler unit, which was also used in the Sunbeam Rapier. The Mk 2 cars from 1975 onwards used the same Getrag 235/5 five-speed gearbox that was offered as an optional but rare gearbox on some models of the BMW 2002, and the Chevette HS. As a deliberate sports car gearbox, this was a close-ratio gearbox: unusually, fifth gear was not an overdrive gear but a direct 1:1 ratio. The Jensen-Healey was sold in Japan, with right-hand drive, but was fitted with USA-spec equipment. It complied with Japanese Government dimension regulations and the engine displacement did not impose a high annual road tax obligation.

Suspension and braking
Suspension was double wishbone and coil springs at the front, and a live rear axle with trailing arms and coils at the rear. Brakes consisted of discs at the front and drums at the rear. The suspension, steering gear, brakes and rear axle were adapted from the Vauxhall Firenza with the exception of the front brakes, which were the widely used Girling Type 14 calipers.

Interior
Jensen-Healey interiors started out comparatively austere and functional, with plastic centre consoles and all-black colour schemes. (Some earlier models do sport brown interiors, however.) In August 1973, aesthetic extras such as a clock, wood grain on the dashboard and glove-box and padding as well as air conditioning as an option were added. 1976 Jensen GT models went even further by offering an elaborate burr walnut wood dashboard and paisley-patterned cloth seats, with leather as an option.

End of production
The oil crisis hit Jensen Motors hard, greatly damaging the sales of its very large V8 Interceptor model and thus degrading its financial condition as a whole. The Jensen GT was then hurriedly brought to market, requiring massive labour expense and taxing the firm's budget even further. By 1974 Lotus was able to supply the required number of engines and production reached 86 cars a week but despite this, the overall situation proved to be too much for the company, which, amid strike action, component shortages and inflation, proceeded to liquidate in 1975 and then close in May 1976.

Racing
Jensen Motors ran a factory team to compete in the Sports Car Club of America (SCCA) D Production Championship. This team was put together by Huffaker Engineering in California, USA.

Although it was a new car, the Jensen-Healey went on to become one of the few cars in SCCA history to win a championship in its first year of racing (1973). The roadster also, uniquely in Sports Car Club of America history, captured five SCCA national "D" production championships.

The initial drivers in 1973 were Lee Mueller and Jon Woodner. In 1974 the lone entry was Lee Mueller. Lee Mueller captured a second D Production championship in 1974. The factory support ended in 1974, however, the West Coast Jensen-Healey dealers combined to put together a late effort in 1975. Huffaker built a new car and although beginning the SCCA season late Mueller, driving again, was able to qualify for the runoffs in Atlanta.

The Huffaker factory cars were later campaigned by the likes of Carl Liebich, Stefan Edliss, Tim Lind, Joe Carr, Tom Kraft, and Jim Reilly.

Bruce Qvale and Joe Huffaker Jr. from Huffaker Engineering, of Sears Point Raceway, Sonoma, California, successfully raced a Jensen-Healey in SCCA E Production, winning the SCCA title in 1995. From 2005 until 2007, Ron Earp of Cary, North Carolina raced a 1974 Jensen-Healey in SCCA Improved Touring S class. The 1973 National Championship winning car was raced by Lind Bros Racing in Waterloo, Iowa USA from 1974 to 1981. Stored from 1982 until 2006 when the car was sent back to Huffaker Engineering for a complete restoration to original 1973 specifications. The car is still owned by Lind Bros Racing and has been driven to victories in Vintage Racing by Pat Lind and Joe Huffaker. In 2013 the car won at the Rolex Monterey Historics, and was awarded the Presidents Cup.

Collectibility
Being a convertible two-seater performance sports car, the Jensen-Healey scores highly as a collectible car. In recent years the majority of cars advertised for sale in the UK have been imported from the US, with the number of registered cars in the UK rising from 330 in 2014 to 420 in late 2019.

Model timeline
 Jensen-Healey Mark I: July 1972 – August 1973; VIN 10000 – 13349 (3356 manufactured)
 Jensen-Healey Mark II and JH5: August 1973 – August 1975; VIN 13500 – 20504 (7142 manufactured)
 Jensen GT: September 1975 – May 1976; VIN 30000 – 30510 (509 manufactured)

Jensen-Healey sales by country.

See also 
 List of car manufacturers of the United Kingdom

References

External links

Jensen-Healey Preservation Society
Jensen cars
Healey Racing
Delta Motor Sports

Jensen vehicles
Sports cars
Cars introduced in 1972